36 Ophiuchi (or Guniibuu for A) is a triple star system 19.5 light-years from Earth. It is in the constellation Ophiuchus.

The primary and secondary stars (also known as HD 155886) are nearly identical orange main-sequence dwarfs of spectral type K2/K1. This binary is unusual because its eruptions do not seem to conform to the Waldmeier effect; that is, the strongest eruptions of HD 155886 are not the ones characterized by the fast eruption onset. The tertiary star is an orange main-sequence dwarf of spectral type K5.

Star C is separated from the A-B pair by 700 arcseconds, compared to a minimum of 4.6 arcseconds for A-B, so its effect on the movements of the A-B pair is small. A and B have active chromospheres.
At present the distance between the stars forming the AB-pair is 5.1 arcseconds and the position angle is 139 degrees, while star C is 731.6 arcseconds away from the A-component and situated at a position angle of 74 degrees.

Nomenclature

In the beliefs of the Kamilaroi and Euahlayi Aboriginal peoples in New South Wales, Australia, the star A is called Guniibuu that represents the robin red-breast bird (Petroica boodang). In 2016, the IAU organized a Working Group on Star Names (WGSN) to catalog and standardize proper names for stars. The WGSN approved the name Guniibuu for the star A on 10 August 2018 and it is now so included in the List of IAU-approved Star Names.

Hunt for substellar objects
The McDonald Observatory team has set limits to the presence of one or more planets around 36 Ophiuchi A with masses between 0.13 and 5.4 Jupiter masses and average separations spanning between 0.05 and 5.2 astronomical units (AU), although beyond 1.5 AU orbits are inherently unstable around either 36 Ophiuchi A or 36 Ophiuchi B.

The star C (or namely HD 156026) is among five nearby paradigms as K-type stars of a type in a 'sweet spot’ between Sun-analog stars and M stars for the likelihood of evolved life, per analysis of Giada Arney from NASA's Goddard Space Flight Center.

Notes

References

Further reading

External links
 
 https://arxiv.org/abs/astro-ph/0604171

Ophiuchus (constellation)
Triple star systems
Ophiuchi, 36
K-type main-sequence stars
Ophiuchi, 36
6401 2
155885 5886 6026
084405 78
CD-26 12026
Ophiuchi, A
RS Canum Venaticorum variables
0663 4
Ophiuchi, V2215